A fire truck is an emergency road vehicle for firefighters.

Fire Truck may also refer to:
 Fire Truck (video game), a black-and-white arcade game
 Fire Truck (song), a song by NCT 127
 "(Firetruck?)", a short song on the album Smofe + Smang: Live in Minneapolis by Mike Doughty

See also